Rafael "Rafa" Jesús Navarro Mazuecos (born 24 February 1994) is a Spanish professional footballer who plays as a right back for Croatian club NK Istra 1961, on loan from Deportivo Alavés.

Club career
Born in Salteras, Seville, Andalusia, Navarro represented Sevilla FC, Coria CF and Real Betis as a youth. He made his senior debut with the latter's B-team on 2 December 2012, starting in a 2–3 home loss against CD San Roque de Lepe in the Segunda División B.

On 2 August 2013, Navarro signed for CD Gerena of the Tercera División. He was an undisputed starter for the club during the campaign, and subsequently returned to Betis and its reserve team on 4 July 2014.

Navarro featured regularly for Betis B in the following seasons, and renewed his contract with the club until 2020 on 13 June 2016. On 24 August, he was definitely promoted to the main squad and was assigned the number 2 shirt.

Navarro made his professional – and La Liga – debut on 23 September 2016, playing the full 90 minutes in a 1–0 home win against Málaga CF. His first goal in the category came on the following 18 March, netting the last in a 2–0 home success over CA Osasuna.

On 2 July 2018, Navarro signed a three-year contract with fellow top-tier club Deportivo Alavés, being immediately loaned to Ligue 2 side FC Sochaux-Montbéliard for one year. Upon returning, he spent the entire 2019–20 campaign unregistered before joining affiliate side NK Istra 1961 on loan on 5 October 2020.

Career statistics

Club

References

External links

Beticopedia profile 

1994 births
Living people
People from Aljarafe
Sportspeople from the Province of Seville
Spanish footballers
Footballers from Andalusia
Association football defenders
La Liga players
Segunda División B players
Tercera División players
Betis Deportivo Balompié footballers
CD Gerena players
Real Betis players
Deportivo Alavés players
Ligue 2 players
FC Sochaux-Montbéliard players
NK Istra 1961 players
Spanish expatriate footballers
Spanish expatriate sportspeople in France
Spanish expatriate sportspeople in Croatia
Expatriate footballers in France
Expatriate footballers in Croatia